Whitney State Forest is a Virginia state forest located in Fauquier County, Northern Virginia, United States, near the town of Warrenton.

References

External links
Whitney State Forest at the Virginia State Forests website

Virginia state forests
Protected areas of Fauquier County, Virginia
1972 establishments in Virginia
Protected areas established in 1972